Ping'an railway station is a railway station of Lafa–Harbin Railway and located in the Shulan of Jilin, Jilin province, China.

See also
Lafa–Harbin Railway

References

Railway stations in Jilin